Anthony Griffin (born 22 March 1979) in Bournemouth, England, is an English retired professional footballer who played as a defender for Bournemouth and Cheltenham Town in the Football League.

External links

1979 births
Living people
Footballers from Bournemouth
English footballers
Association football defenders
AFC Bournemouth players
Cheltenham Town F.C. players
Dorchester Town F.C. players
English Football League players
New Milton Town F.C. players